La Vie en Rose (literally Life in pink,) is a 2007 French biographical musical film about the life of French singer Édith Piaf. The film was co-written and directed by Olivier Dahan, and stars Marion Cotillard as Piaf. The UK and US title La Vie en Rose comes from Piaf's signature song.

Cotillard's performance earned her several accolades including the Academy Award for Best Actress — marking the first time an Oscar had been given for a French-language role — the BAFTA Award for Best Actress in a Leading Role, the Golden Globe Award for Best Actress – Motion Picture Musical or Comedy and the César Award for Best Actress in a Leading Role for her performance. The film also won the Academy Award for Best Makeup, the BAFTA Award for Best Makeup, Costume Design, Film Music, four additional César Awards

Accolades

References

External links
 

Vie en Rose